Warrior is an American martial arts crime drama television series that premiered on April 5, 2019, on Cinemax. It is based on an original concept and treatment by Bruce Lee, and is executive-produced by his daughter, Shannon Lee, and film director Justin Lin. Jonathan Tropper, known for the Cinemax original series Banshee, is the showrunner.

In April 2019, Cinemax renewed the series for a second season which premiered on October 2, 2020. It was Cinemax's final series before ceasing production of original programming.

In April 2021, the series was renewed for a third season, along with the announcement that the series will move to HBO Max.

Plot
Set during the Tong Wars in late 1870s San Francisco, the series follows Ah Sahm, a martial arts prodigy who emigrates from China in search of his sister, only to be sold to one of the most powerful tongs in Chinatown.

Cast

Main
 Andrew Koji as Ah Sahm, a Chinese martial arts expert from Foshan who travels to San Francisco in search of his elder sister, Xiaojing, who emigrated years prior.
 Olivia Cheng as Ah Toy, a madam who runs a brothel in Chinatown. She is adept at wielding the dao.
 Jason Tobin as Young Jun, Father Jun's son and successor who befriends Ah Sahm. He is skilled with throwing knives.
 Dianne Doan as Mai Ling, the wife of Long Zii, head of the Long Zii Tong. Formerly known as Xiaojing, she is Ah Sahm's elder sister who fled China to escape her abusive husband, the warlord Sun Yang, whom she was forced to marry to save her brother's life. She is the de facto leader of the Long Zii.
 Kieran Bew as Bill "Big Bill" O'Hara, an Irish police officer promoted to lead the Chinatown squad. He is former friends with Dylan Leary, as both men were Union soldiers during the American Civil War. Due to his gambling problems, he is often in trouble with both the Chinese and Irish gangs.
 Dean Jagger as Dylan Leary, an American Civil War veteran, labor unionist, and leader of the Irish Mob. He loathes the Chinese, whom he blames for taking away jobs that he believes are meant for the Irish.
 Joanna Vanderham as Penelope Blake, the wife of Mayor Samuel Blake. She and her husband do not get along, as she only married him to save her father's failing business. She later falls in love with Ah Sahm after he saves her life.
 Tom Weston-Jones as Richard Henry Lee, a new police officer from Savannah, Georgia. He is disliked by his Irish colleagues, who are Union veterans, due to his family having fought for the Confederacy. Despite being from the south, he is much more racially tolerant compared to his peers.
 Hoon Lee as Wang Chao, a black market salesman who acquires various contraband for the tongs and the San Francisco police. Because of his connections, he is free to travel throughout all of the tongs' territories and even serves as a mediator between them. It is later revealed that he was enslaved for a time in Cuba.
 Langley Kirkwood as Walter Franklin Buckley, the Deputy Mayor of San Francisco who secretly conspires with Mai Ling to start a gang war between the Hop Wei and the Long Zii.
 Christian McKay as Samuel Blake, the Mayor of San Francisco and Penelope's husband. Despite espousing anti-Chinese views to gain the support of his constituents, he secretly frequents Ah Toy's brothel to be serviced by both male and female Chinese prostitutes. (seasons 1–2)
 Perry Yung as Father Jun, leader of the Hop Wei Tong and Young Jun's father.
 Joe Taslim as Li Yong, a skilled martial artist who serves as the Long Zii's enforcer. He is Ah Sahm's main rival and Mai Ling's lover.
 Dustin Nguyen as Zing, the new leader of the Fung Hai Tong and Mai Ling's ally. (season 2–present, recurring season 1)
 Céline Buckens as Sophie Mercer, Penelope's reckless younger sister who seeks to gain Leary's attention. (season 2–present)
 Miranda Raison as Nellie Davenport, a wealthy widow who offers asylum to Chinese migrants, particularly prostitutes. She becomes romantically involved with Ah Toy. (season 2–present)
 Chen Tang as Hong, an abrasive, young new recruit brought over from China as reinforcement for the Hop Wei. He quickly befriends Young Jun and Ah Sahm when they come to his defense after he is ridiculed for being gay. He often fights with a chain that he wears as a necklace. (season 2–present)
 Maria-Elena Laas as Rosalita Vega, a Mexican woman who runs illegal fighting tournaments on the Barbary Coast, which Ah Sahm frequents. (season 2)

Recurring
 Emily Child as Lucy O'Hara, Bill's wife.
 Graham Hopkins as Byron Mercer, Penelope and Sophie's father. (season 1)
 Henry Yuk as Long Zii, the elderly leader of the Long Zii tong. (season 1)
 David Butler as Russell Flanagan, San Francisco's chief of police.
 Rich Ting as Bolo, a former railroad worker ("coolie") turned underground fighter who was saved by Father Jun. He serves as the Hop Wei's primary muscle and assassin. (season 1)
 Brendan Sean Murray as Jack Damon, an Irish debt collector working for the Fung Hai. (season 1)
 Kenneth Fok as Jacob, Penelope Blake's Chinese manservant. (seasons 1–2)
 Jenny Umbhau as Lai, a young girl from Shandong province who aids Ah Toy on her missions. Like Ah Toy, she is skilled with the dao.
 Robert Hobbs as Stone, a police officer patrolling Chinatown under Bill's command.
 Nicholas Pauling as Harrison, another of the police officers in Chinatown under Bill's command.
 Patrick Baladi as Robert Crestwood, an anti-Chinese Senator who seeks to become president.
 André Jacobs as Lymon Merriweather, a wealthy businessman who frequently deals with the Mayor.
 Frank Rautenbach as Leonard Patterson, a businessman who serves as Ah Toy's frontman when purchasing land. (seasons 1–2)
 Gaosi Raditholo as Abigail, an African American bartender who seduces and drugs Lee, and becomes romantically involved with him later on. She also plays Nora, Lee's deceased lover from Georgia.
 Emmanuel Castis as Clyde Nichols, an ex-Pinkerton agent hired by Mai Ling to gather information on Buckley. (season 2)

Guest
 C. S. Lee as Lu, a former coolie and co-owner of the saloon Ah Sahm and Young Jun take shelter in. (season 1)
 Erica Wessels as Billie, Lu's wife and co-owner of the saloon. (season 1)
 Rachel Colwell as Wankeia, a Native American prostitute Young Jun falls in love with. (season 1)
 Andrew Stock as Father Flynn, a priest who helps defend the saloon from bandits. (season 1)
 Christiaan Schoombie as Harlan French, leader of a gang of bandits. (season 1)
 Henry Kwok as Lao Ting, a Chinese businessman who ships people from China to the US. (season 1)
 James Lew as Sifu Li Qiang, a kung fu master who trained Ah Sahm in his youth. (season 1)
 Michelle Allen as Claire, a prostitute and the mother of Wang Chao's illegitimate daughter. (season 2)
 Nat Ramabulana as Jack "Happy Jack", the African American leader of a trafficking ring who enters into a partnership with Young Jun and Ah Sahm. (season 2–present)
 Paolo Wilken as Lao Che, leader of the Young Suey Sing Tong, who are subsequently massacred by Zing and his men. (season 2)
 Conor Mullen as Elijah Rooker, a rich tycoon and owner of Rooker's Mill, a border town where he hosts fighting tournaments. (season 2)
 Michael Bisping as Dolph Jagger, an aggressive fighter who participates in the tournament at Rooker's Mill. (season 2)
 Maria Elisa Camargo as Marisol Rooker, Elijah's wife and, secretly, Rosalita's sister. (season 2)
 Christos Vasilopoulos as Smits, Rooker's head of security. (season 2)
 Brad Kelly as "Cleaver", one half of a hitman duo that Patterson hires to kill Ah Toy. (season 2)
 Jason William Day as "Hammer", the other half of the hitman duo that Patterson hires. (season 2)
 Patrick Buchanan as Tully, an Irishman who leads an angry mob on a rampage in Chinatown. (season 2)
 Martin Munro as Leonard Raise, a corrupt reporter with ties to Buckley. (season 2)

Episodes

Season 1 (2019)

Season 2 (2020)

Production 
In 1971, Bruce Lee developed a concept for a television series titled Ah Sahm, about a martial artist in the American Old West. However, Lee had difficulty pitching the series to Warner Bros. and Paramount. According to Lee's widow, Linda Lee Cadwell, Warner Bros. retooled and renamed Lee's concept into Kung Fu, starring David Carradine in the lead role. Warner Bros. stated that they had already begun developing a similar concept, created by writers and producers Ed Spielman and Howard Friedlander, which was later confirmed by Fred Weintraub's memoir and Matthew E. Polly's authoritative biography. According to these sources, Bruce Lee was not cast in the lead role in part because of his ethnicity, but more so because of his accent.

In 2015, Perfect Storm Entertainment and Bruce Lee's daughter, Shannon Lee, announced that the series would be produced and would air on Cinemax, and that filmmaker Justin Lin would serve as co-producer with Lee. Production began on October 22, 2017, in Cape Town, South Africa, at Cape Town Film Studios. The first season featured ten episodes and premiered on April 5, 2019.

Fight choreography was created by Brett Chan as the main stunt coordinator, with Johnny Yang and Jason Ng serving as  assistant stunt coordinators. Both Chan and Yang are members of the Hitz International stunt team, though Nomad Stunts and Titan Stunts also performed choreography for the series.

On April 24, 2019, Cinemax renewed the series for a second season. It was Cinemax's final original series before ceasing production of original programming. In January 2021, both seasons began streaming on HBO Max. With the cancellation on Cinemax and the uncertainty of renewal, fans created a petition asking for a third season of the series. The petition received over 68,000 signatures as of April 2021.

On April 14, 2021, the series was renewed for a third season, along with the announcement that it would officially move to HBO Max. Production for the third season began on July 18, 2022 in Cape Town, and finished at the end of October 2022. It is expected to premiere in 2023.

Broadcast
In the United Kingdom, the first season premiered on June 25, 2019, on Sky One. The second season premiered on October 14, 2020. In Australia, the first season premiered on June 12, 2019, on Fox8. In Canada, both seasons are available for streaming on Crave.

Reception
The first season received positive reviews from critics. On review aggregator Rotten Tomatoes, the series holds an approval rating of 89% based on 29 reviews, with an average rating of 7.55/10. The site's critical consensus reads, "Though it often buckles under the weight of its lofty ambitions and ideological pedigree, Warrior devil may care attitude provides thrilling energy and action that will please those looking for a period drama with a little kick." On Metacritic, it has a weighted average score of 68 out of 100, based on 8 critics, indicating "generally favorable reviews". Rolling Stone magazine named Cinemax's Warrior one of the best new television shows of 2019.

As of April 16, 2021, Warrior is ranked among the top 15 most viewed series on HBO Max.

Awards and nominations
Warrior was nominated for two Critics' Choice Super Awards at the 1st Critics' Choice Super Awards.

Historical references 
 Ah Toy is loosely based on the Chinese American madam Ah Toy.
 Dylan Leary is loosely based on the California labor leader Denis Kearney.
 Nellie Davenport is loosely based on the sex slavery abolitionist Donaldina Cameron.
Deputy Mayor Buckley is likely, loosely based on late 19th- and early 20th-century San Francisco political boss, Christopher A. Buckley.
 In the first episode, the names of two police officers, Stone and Keller, are mentioned as potential members of the Chinatown task force. Lieutenant Mike Stone and Inspector Steve Keller were the lead characters during the first four seasons of the police drama series, The Streets of San Francisco.
The riot in season 2 is largely based on the real life Los Angeles Chinese massacre of 1871 and the San Francisco riot of 1877, both part of the larger historic anti-Chinese violence in California.

References

Bibliography

External links 
  on Cinemax
 

American action television series
Chinese American television
2010s American crime drama television series
2020s American crime drama television series
2019 American television series debuts
English-language television shows
Cinemax original programming
HBO Max original programming
Serial drama television series
Television shows set in San Francisco
Television series set in the 1870s
Martial arts television series
Asian-American television
Triad (organized crime)
Tongs (organizations)